La Voz (Spanish for The Voice) is a Spanish reality talent show broadcast on Antena 3. It premiered on 19 September 2012 and is part of the international syndication The Voice based on the original Dutch television program The Voice of Holland, created by Dutch television producer John de Mol.

Seven completed seasons have aired since the show's inception in 2012, with the eighth season to begin in September 2021. Telecinco originally aired the series through to season 5 with Antena 3 continuing the broadcasting from season 6.

The coaching panel for the most recent 2022 season consisted of returning coach Luis Fonsi, and previous coaches Pablo López, Antonio Orozco, and Laura Pausini who all returned after a one season hiatus.

Overview

Format 
The show consists of three phases: a blind audition, a battle phase, and live performance shows. Four judges also known as coaches, all noteworthy recording artists, choose teams of contestants through a blind audition process. Each judge has the length of the auditioner's performance (about one minute) to decide if he or she wants that performer on his or her team; if two or more judges want the same performer (as happens frequently), the performer has the final choice of which coach's team to join.

After the coaches fill each respective slots in their team the batch of singers in the team is mentored and developed by its respective coach. In the second stage, called the battle phase, coaches have two of their team members battle against each other directly by singing the same song together on a stage that looks like a battle ring, with the coach choosing which team member to advance from each of individual "battles" into the first live round.

Within that first live round, the surviving four acts from each team again compete head-to-head, with public votes determining one of two acts from each team that will advance to the final eight, while the coach chooses which of the remaining three acts comprises the other performer remaining on the team.

In the final phase, the remaining contestants compete against each other in live broadcasts. The television audience and the coaches have equal say 50/50 in deciding who moves on to the final 4 phase. With one team member remaining for each coach, the (final 4) contestants compete against each other in the finale with the outcome decided solely by public vote.

Development, production and marketing 
Mediaset Spain acquired the rights of the franchise back in 2011 after the success of the US counterpart. Initially it was expected to air on Cuatro, but in November 2011 Mediaset confirmed the show would premiere on the group’s main channel instead in spring 2012. Later, in February 2012 the air date was moved to fall 2012 and Jesús Vázquez, who had previous experience presenting talent shows like Popstars and Operación Triunfo, was confirmed as host. The names of the four coaches were confirmed by February 2012: David Bisbal, Malú, Rosario Flores and Melendi. Filming for the blind auditions stage of the competition began on 21 August 2012. On 29 August 2012 it was made known that Tania Llasera would serve as the social networking correspondent. The premiere, scheduled for 19 September 2012, was preceded two days before by a preview that aired simultaneously on all channels of the Mediaset Spain group.

Telecinco aired five seasons of La Voz between 2012 and 2017, as well as four seasons of La Voz Kids between 2014 and 2018. In June 2018, Atresmedia acquired the rights for the format and will produce new seasons of La Voz and La Voz Kids, as well as the first season of La Voz Senior.

Coaches and hosts

The original coaches panel consisted of David Bisbal, Rosario Flores, Malú and Melendi with Jesús Vázquez and Tania Llasera as host and social media correspondent. Bisbal, Flores and Malu returned for season 2 with Antonio Orozco replacing Melendi. Alejandro Sanz and Laura Pausini replaced David Bisbal and Rosario Flores in the third season. In the fourth season Manuel Carrasco replaced Pausini and Orozco was replaced by original coach, Melendi. Sanz and Melendi were then replaced by Juanes and Pablo López in the fifth season.

In 2018, the series was acquired by Atresmedia. 
For the sixth season, Pablo López continued as coach, Antonio Orozco returned after a two-season hiatus, and Luis Fonsi and Paulina Rubio joined the panel. On November 8, 2019, it was announced that López and Orozco would remain on the panel for the seventh season and would be joined by returning coaches Pausini and Sanz who would replace Rubio and Fonsi who left the panel due to him coaching La Voz US. The seventh season featured a fifth coach Miriam Rodríguez, who choose no-chair turn auditioners to participate in The Comeback Stage. After being season seven's winning coach, Laura Pausini stated she would not return to the reality show.

On April 19, 2021, it was officially confirmed that Alejandro Sanz would be the only coach returning for season eight, while Pausini, Orozco and López had left from coaching, being replaced by returning coaches Malú and Luis Fonsi and first time coach Pablo Alborán.

On July 30, 2022, it was officially confirmed that Luis Fonsi would be only coach returning for season nine, while López, Orozco and Pausini returned after one season hiatus, replacing Sanz, Malú and Alborán.

Coaches' timeline

Key 
 Featured as a full-time coach
 Featured as a part-time advisor

Coaches' advisors

Presenters timeline

Series overview
Warning: the following table presents a significant amount of different colors.

Seasons' summaries

Season 1: 2012 

Season 1 premiered on Telecinco on 19 September 2012. The first episode kicked off with 4.591 viewers (30.6% market share), becoming an instant success. The final, on 19 December 2012, was watched by 5.453 million viewers, a market share of 37.3%. The winner of the first season was Rafa Blas.

Season 2: 2013 

One week before the successful Season 1 was over, on 13 December 2012, Telecinco announced that they had renewed the show for a second season in 2013. On 22 January 2013, Melendi announced that he would not continue as a coach on the second season. On 5 June 2013, it was confirmed that Melendi would be replaced by Antonio Orozco, whereas Bisbal, Flores and Malú continued. Filming for the second season began on 15 July 2013. The second season premiered on 16 September 2013, garnering 3.438 million viewers (23.3% market share) in the official ratings.

Season 3: 2015 
Filming for the third season began in January 2015. David Bisbal and Rosario Flores were replaced by Alejandro Sanz and Laura Pausini, while Malú and Antonio Orozco continued as coaches. The third season premiered on 23 March 2015 garnering 4.591 million viewers (28.1% market share) in the official ratings.

Season 4: 2016 
Filming for the fourth season began in June 2016. Antonio Orozco and Laura Pausini were replaced by Melendi, who had been absent since the original season, and Manuel Carrasco, while Malú and Alejandro Sanz continued as coaches.

Season 5: 2017 
Filming for the fifth season began in July 2017. Alejandro Sanz and Melendi were replaced by Juanes and Pablo López, while Malú and Manuel Carrasco continued as coaches.

Season 6: 2019 

Filming for the sixth season began in November 2018, and it ran from 7 January to 10 April 2019. Pablo López was the only coach from the previous season to continue, while Antonio Orozco returned after two seasons of absence and Luis Fonsi and Paulina Rubio both debuted in the Spanish series.

Season 7: 2020 

The seventh season started on September 11, 2020. Antonio Orozco and Pablo López returned as coaches, while Alejandro Sanz and Laura Pausini, replacing Paulina Rubio and Luis Fonsi as coaches.

Season 8: 2021 

The eighth season premiered on September 17, 2021. Alejandro Sanz is the only coach returning from the previous season. He was joined by former coaches Malú and Luis Fonsi, and first-time coach Pablo Alborán, replacing Laura Pausini, Pablo López and Antonio Orozco.

Season 9: 2022 

The ninth season premiered on September 23, 2022. Luis Fonsi returned as the only coach from the previous season, while Antonio Orozco, Pablo López, and Laura Pausini after one season hiatus returned for their fifth, fourth, and third season, respectively. This season was produced to be a dedication to the ten-year anniversary of the show.

Coaches' teams 
These are each of the coaches' teams throughout the seasons' live shows. Highlighted in green is the winning coach/team. Winners are in bold and finalists in italic.

Awards

References

External links 
Official website on Telecinco.es

Spain
2012 Spanish television series debuts
Spanish reality television series
Spanish television series based on non-Spanish television series
Telecinco original programming
Antena 3 (Spanish TV channel) original programming